Chak No. 4/G.D. (Punjabi) is a village in Okara District near Renala Khurd  in Pakistan.
It is located in a fertile area just under 13 kilometers (7.5 miles) north of the city across the Lower Bari Doab canal.  It is the main village on the Chuchak Road and is also a union council center.

The population here depends on agriculture, although many people work in other fields such as defense, teaching, and engineering. It has a co-ed High school, a branch of National Bank of Pakistan (branch code 1577), an agricultural office, and also a veterinary hospital.

History 
Before British colonization the village was known as Gulam Rasool Wala, after its Punjabi founder. Hafiz Ghulam Rasool, who was the forefather of the Jat Jura family living in the village. During the establishment of a British canal in this area, the region was divided based on the water availability with the name 4/G.D which actually refers to 4th Gugera Drain(4/G.D). Such a naming practice was common for the British to re-purpose and identify conquered villages.

Religion 
The primary religion of the village is Islam, with a large number of Ahl al-Hadith and also Sunni.
There are two mosques in the village, one of each denomination. Peace, harmony and good social relations exist between the religious factions of the town. Due to its proximity to the Indian Border, the town also bears influences of Hinduism and Sikhism which existed in this region before the India-Pakistan Partition in 1947.

Economics 
The fertile soil in the region surrounding the village of Chak 4/G.D has created an economy dependent on agriculture, as it is located near a Doab (a confluence of two or more rivers). However, availability of agricultural land is limited due to the tightly packed farms of neighboring villages, which has led local people to pursue other fields such as business and government jobs.

Politics 
The majority of residents belong to the Rajput Kamyana clan. This group descends from the tribe of Hazrat Mian Kamman, a figure who is buried east of Islampur in Old Kamman within the ghoripal land possessed by Mian Asim Kamyana, essentially a subcaste of Dhudhi. There are some Lahi - Kharal, Bhatti and some also belong to Jat Jura families.

In the years 1980 to 2000, Haji Mian Bashir Ahmad Kamyana was the one of the active political leader. He had a lot of worth in4/G.D and the villages surrounding it. His son Mian Shaheen Kamyana and also Chairman of 4gd union Council. was also the Public leader, he had an intelligent mind for making decisions. Politically, this village struggles to be represented in the local government. Chaudhry Saif Ullah Jat Jura was also elected as General Councillor and his father Chaudhry Abdullah Qazi Was also General Councillor from the village. Chaudhry Muhammad Shahbaz Jat Jura is also selected as Chairman Ushr and Zakat Committee Second Time. Jat Jura family has a great influence on the politics of the village. The Kamyana clan do not form the majority in the larger local constituency and other clans like Kharal, Bhatti, and Lashari mostly win local elections. As a result, Chak 4/G.D receives disproportionately less development funds from the government.

Organizations 
The main organizations working for the development of the village are:
 Al-Muhammdia Students Federation (Youth Representative): Organizes debate competitions every year for developing confidence among local students, and welfare activities...Arranges Street lights, Floodlight Tournaments..and many more activities for youth to make them responsible and active persons. 
 Itihad Welfare Society: Development of villagers
Education institutions 
 Ideal college for boys & girls working since 2017 with financial & moral support by Eng Muhammad Tayyab S/O Muhammad Ayoub. which have Good academic record?
 Govt high school for boys and Nadeem shaheed Govt. Girls Higher secondary school with very good academic records.
Jamia LilBanat, a Madarsa for girls: religious institution for girls is also working since long ago and with the financial and moral support of Altaf Ur Rehman S/O Muhammad Yousaf Sajid new modern building with all amenities has been completed.  

   Rabitah Al Eman:   this organization is working on self-help bases. local residents provide funds which are spent to provide ration, case, and other financial support to poor families
Sports Union 4.G.D

Sports Union 4 GD is a village based Sports organisation. It founded on July, 2015. It mainly focused on the Sports related issues of the village. For inculcating positive qualities in younger generation of the village, Sports Union organises different Sports events on regular basis. Annual Jashn-e-Aazadi Sports Festival is the main event. Four Cricket Clubs (Nadeem Shaheed Cricket Club, Young Liones Cricket Club, Fata Cricket Club and Ravians Cricket Club) are its full members. While, Football Club and Badminton clubs have associated membership. 
Abdul Ghaffar is the Current President of Sports Union 4 GD. He is the head of the Organization since 2019.
 Nadeem Shaeed Cricket Club is affiliated with Sports Union 4 GD.
This club is 5 time champion of 14 August League.

Sports 
Sports are a big source of entertainment, especially among local youth. Cricket, volleyball, badminton and football are the most popular sports. The local boys' high school is used as the center of sporting activities because there are no dedicated facilities for sports events. Young students often organize sports with neighboring villages on their own initiative.

See also 
 Renala Khurd

References

Union councils of Okara District
Villages in Okara District